Carlo Dante Rota (born 17 April 1961) is a British-born Canadian actor. He has appeared in Little Mosque on the Prairie and as systems analyst Morris O'Brian on the Fox series 24. He also co-starred as Emilio Solano in Jane the Virgin.

Early life
Rota was born in London, England, to Italian parents, Rina, who worked in the restaurant business, and Dante Rota, a chef. He grew up in Osterley with two sisters and one brother. Through his life he has lived in many places of the world, including Hong Kong (where he attended Island School), the Bahamas and the U.K before his family settled in Toronto. Rota worked in the culinary industry for many years, operating and owning several restaurants in Toronto until he decided to pursue an acting career. According to his interview in the book Inside Section One: Creating and Producing TV's La Femme Nikita, he said of this decision: "To turn around and tell everyone at the tender age of 30, 'Now I'm going to be an actor', most people just think that you're going through something."

Career

Almost immediately thereafter, Rota landed roles in the Canadian TV series Street Legal and the critically acclaimed Canadian independent film Thirty Two Short Films About Glenn Gould. Because of his experience prior to acting, he also hosted the Great Canadian Food Show for CBC television in Canada, a series which was nominated for the James Beard Award for Excellence in Culinary Journalism.

He has appeared in TV series including 24, Queer as Folk (US version), Castle, La Femme Nikita, Relic Hunter, Adventure Inc, A Nero Wolfe Mystery, The Gospel of John, and Traders. Rota co-starred in the CBC sitcom Little Mosque on the Prairie, playing Lebanese-Canadian construction contractor Yasir Hamoudi. In 2008, Rota portrayed Charles, who was a journalist for The Herald, in Saw V.

On 24, Rota portrayed the recurring role of Morris O'Brian, the arrogant but brilliant computer scientist husband of Chloe O'Brian, appearing most extensively in season 6. He had a recurring role on the TV series La Femme Nikita (1997 — 2001) as the smarmy, green-listed terrorist informant, Mick Schtoppel, later revealed to be Mr. Jones, the head of Center, an organization above Oversight that directs all Sections. In turn, Mr. Jones is revealed to be another cover identity for Reginald "Martin" Henderson. Henderson is exposed as an actor working for Center as a decoy for the real Mr. Jones.

He has made guest appearances in many other television series, including Stargate Universe, playing Carl Strom, head of the International Oversight Advisory, the civilian oversight committee that heads up the Atlantis expedition and its funding, as a villain named "The Ghost" on White Collar, as well as roles on CSI: NY, Human Target, Castle, The Mentalist, Bones, and Grimm. He also appeared on NCIS: Los Angeles in the episode "Found" as Kalil Abramson, as well as on AMC's show, Breaking Bad. He was a guest on episode 11 of the second season of Top Chef Canada, the episode dedicated to Italian cuisine 1. He acts as Edmund Wooler, in World Without End on Reelz Channel.

Personal life

Rota married 24 and Relic Hunter co-star Nazneen Contractor on 1 April 2010 They have two children, a son and a daughter.

During his time on the show 24, Rota spent nine months a year living in Los Angeles, California. He stated in an interview with the Toronto Star that he considers Toronto his home. As of 2008, he owned a house in Queen Street West, having lived on and off in the area for at least 20 years.

Filmography

Film

Television

Video games

References

Bibliography
 Heyn, Christopher. "A Conversation with Carlo Rota." Inside Section One: Creating and Producing TV's La Femme Nikita. Introduction by Peta Wilson. Los Angeles: Persistence of Vision Press, 2006. 82–87. . In-depth conversation with Carlo Rota about his role as Schtoppel on La Femme Nikita, as well as his culinary background and early acting experiences.

External links
 
 Carlo Rota Interview on The Hour with George Stroumboulopoulos
 Little Mosque's Carlo Rota a Chameleon, Interview – AOL Entertainment

1961 births
20th-century Canadian male actors
20th-century English male actors
21st-century Canadian male actors
21st-century English male actors
Canadian male film actors
Canadian male television actors
Canadian people of Italian descent
Canadian television hosts
Canadian male voice actors
English emigrants to Canada
English male film actors
English male television actors
English people of Italian descent
Living people
Male actors from London
Male actors from Toronto
People educated at Island School